Tuure Siira (born 25 October 1994) is a Finnish professional footballer who plays for Haka, as a midfielder.

Career
On 18 November 2022, Siira signed a two-year contract with Haka, beginning in the 2023 season.

References

1994 births
Sportspeople from Oulu
Living people
Finnish footballers
Finland youth international footballers
Association football midfielders
AC Oulu players
FC Ilves players
FC Haka players
Veikkausliiga players
Ykkönen players